Włodzimierz Cieślak (born 23 April 1950, in Zgierz) is a Polish former wrestler who competed in the 1972 Summer Olympics.

References

External links
 

1950 births
Living people
Olympic wrestlers of Poland
Wrestlers at the 1972 Summer Olympics
Polish male sport wrestlers
People from Zgierz
Sportspeople from Łódź Voivodeship